John McKeon (March 29, 1808, Albany, New York – November 22, 1883, New York City) was an American lawyer and politician from New York. From 1835 to 1837, and 1841 to 1843, he served two non-consecutive terms in the U.S. House of Representatives as Jacksonian.

Life 
He was the son of Capt. James McKeon who fought in the War of 1812. He graduated from the law department of Columbia College in 1828, was admitted to the bar, and commenced practice in New York City.

Political career 
McKeon was a representative in the New York State Assembly from 1832 to 1834.

Congress 
He was elected as a Jacksonian to the 24th United States Congress, serving from March 4, 1835, to March 3, 1837, but was defeated for re-election. He was elected as a Democrat to the 27th United States Congress, serving from March 4, 1841, to March 3, 1843, but was again defeated for re-election.

Later career 
In February 1846, he was appointed New York County District Attorney and, when the office became elective under the State Constitution of 1846, was elected in May 1847 to succeed himself.  He remained in office until the end of 1850 when his term expired. In this office, he secured the conviction of  Madame Restell.

He was appointed by President Franklin Pierce United States Attorney for the Southern District of New York, and served from July 10, 1854, to January 7, 1858. While holding this office, he prosecuted a number of important cases. Among them were the attempt to enlist men to serve in the British Army during the Crimean War, and the seizure of the filibustering ship "Northern Light."

He was again New York County D.A. from 1882 until his death in office.

Death 
He died at his residence at 44, West 37th Street, and was buried in a family vault under the old St. Patrick's Cathedral on Mott Street in New York City.

References

External links

The New York Civil List compiled by Franklin Benjamin Hough (pages 211ff and 377; Weed, Parsons and Co., 1858)
SKETCH OF THE CANDIDATES in NYT on October 19, 1881
JOHN M'KEON'S WORK DONE in NYT on November 23, 1883
Attribution

1808 births
1883 deaths
Columbia College (New York) alumni
New York County District Attorneys
Democratic Party members of the New York State Assembly
United States Attorneys for the Southern District of New York
Jacksonian members of the United States House of Representatives from New York (state)
Democratic Party members of the United States House of Representatives from New York (state)
19th-century American politicians
19th-century American lawyers